Pachim Samaria is a village in Kamrup, situated in north bank of river Brahmaputra .

Transport
Pachim Samaria is accessible through National Highway 31. All major private commercial vehicles ply between Pachim Samaria and nearby towns.

See also
 Nahira
 Nampara Majarkuri

References

Villages in Kamrup district